Isophrictis striatella is a moth of the family Gelechiidae. It is found in most of Europe, as well as Turkey and North America.

The wingspan is about 12 mm. Adults are on wing from mid June until September.

The larvae feed on Tanacetum vulgare, Achillea ptarmica and Artemisia vulgaris.

References

External links

Funet
Lepidoptera of Belgium

Isophrictis
Moths described in 1775
Moths of Europe
Moths of Asia
Moths of North America